Austria participated in the Eurovision Song Contest 2004 with the song "Du bist" written by Peter Zimmermann. The song was performed by the group Tie Break. The Austrian broadcaster Österreichischer Rundfunk (ORF) organised the national final Song.Null.Vier in order to select the Austrian entry for the 2004 contest in Istanbul, Turkey. Ten songs competed in a televised show where a public vote exclusively selected "Du bist" performed by Tie Break as the winner.

As one of ten highest placed finishers in the 2003 contest, Austria directly qualified to compete in the final of the Eurovision Song Contest which took place on 15 May 2004. Performing in position 2, Austria placed twenty-first out of the 24 participating countries with 9 points.

Background

The Austrian national broadcaster, Österreichischer Rundfunk (ORF), broadcasts the event within Austria and organises the selection process for the nation's entry. ORF confirmed their intentions to participate at the 2004 Eurovision Song Contest on 7 October 2003. From 1995 to 2000, ORF has held an internal selection to choose the artist and song to represent Austria at the contest, while the broadcaster had set up national finals with several artists to choose both the song and performer to compete at Eurovision for Austria in 2002 and 2003. Along with their participation confirmation, the broadcaster also announced that the Austrian entry for the 2004 contest would be selected through a national final.

Before Eurovision

Song.Null.Vier 
Song.Null.Vier (Song.Zero.Four) was the national final that selected Austria's entry for the Eurovision Song Contest 2004. The competition took place on 5 March 2004 at the ORF Center in Vienna, hosted by Boris Uran and Oliver Auspitz and broadcast on ORF eins. The first part of the national final was watched by 614,000 viewers in Austria, while the second part was watched by 600,000 viewers in Austria.

Competing entries 
Nine artists were nominated by record companies, while a tenth act was chosen through a wildcard selection. For the wildcard selection, ORF invited all interested artists to submit their songs to the broadcaster between 10 December 2003 and 2 February 2004, with the received submissions being reviewed by a team of music professionals. The nine nominated artists and songs were revealed on 9 February 2004, while the song "Sexuality" performed by André Leherb was revealed on 19 February 2004 as the winner of the wildcard selection. Among the competing artists was former Austrian Eurovision representative Waterloo and Robinson who represented Austria in the Eurovision Song Contest 1976.

Final 
The televised final took place on 5 March 2004. Ten songs competed and public televoting exclusively selected "Du bist" performed by Tie Break as the winner.

Controversy 
Following the national final, runners-up Waterloo and Robinson filed a lawsuit against Tie Break claiming that "Du bist" exceeded three minutes in length and had plagiarised the song "Für dich" by German singer Yvonne Catterfield. The lawsuit was subsequently rejected on formal legal grounds, while ORF issued a statement in response that "The minimal exceedance of the time limit [...] is no reason for disqualification" and that the song would be reduced to three minutes at the Eurovision Song Contest.

At Eurovision

It was announced that the competition's format would be expanded to include a semi-final in 2004. According to the rules, all nations with the exceptions of the host country, the "Big Four" (France, Germany, Spain and the United Kingdom) and the ten highest placed finishers in the 2003 contest are required to qualify from the semi-final in order to compete for the final; the top ten countries from the semi-final progress to the final. As Austria finished sixth in the 2003 contest, the nation automatically qualified to compete in the final on 15 May 2004. On 23 March 2004, a special allocation draw was held which determined the running order and Austria was set to perform in position 2 in the final, following the entry from Spain and before the entry from Norway. Austria placed twenty-first in the final, scoring 9 points.

The semi-final and the final were broadcast in Austria on ORF eins with commentary by Andi Knoll. The Austrian spokesperson, who announced the Austrian votes during the final, was Dodo Roscic.

Voting 
Below is a breakdown of points awarded to Austria and awarded by Austria in the semi-final and grand final of the contest. The nation awarded its 12 points to Serbia and Montenegro in the semi-final and the final of the contest.

Points awarded to Austria

Points awarded by Austria

References

External links
Austrian National Final page

2004
Countries in the Eurovision Song Contest 2004
Eurovision